Sweifieh (also spelled Swéfiéh and Swéfieyé) is a neighborhood located in the western area of the Jordanian capital Amman. It is in the Wadi as-Ser district.

Life

Sweifieh is best known for its night-life and its shopping culture, malls and shopping centres are scattered around, the best known being the Albaraka Mall due to its accessible location and quality shops. Another landmark of the area is the well known Wakalat Street (Agencies Street), a Pedestrian zone containing dozens of expensive and luxurious shops and cafés.

The area is served by several clubs, cafés, restaurants, bars and hotels. The exclusive clubs tend to move away slightly towards the nearby Abdoun area which is calmer and has an exclusive undertone to it.

In 2013 a large "The Galleria Mall" branch was opened in Sweifieh, which added a lot of attraction to the area due to its many diverse cafés, shops, boutiques, supermarket chain Carrefour.

Transportation
The area is served by several bus lines and taxis. Most of the taxis in Sweifieh only go to other regions in the western part of the metropolis, whereas the bus line connects with the Downtown station at one point.

References

Neighbourhoods of Amman